the World Checklist of Selected Plant Families and The Plant List recognise about 750 accepted taxa (of species and infraspecific names) in the plant genus Diospyros.

A

 Diospyros abyssinica  
 Diospyros acapulcensis  
 subsp. nicaraguensis  
 subsp. verae-crucis  
 Diospyros acocksii  
 Diospyros acreana  
 Diospyros acris  
 Diospyros aculeata  
 Diospyros acuminata  
 Diospyros acuta  
 Diospyros addita  
 Diospyros adenophora  
 Diospyros adiensis  
 Diospyros aequoris  
 subsp. martineziana  
 subsp. rekoi  
 Diospyros affinis  
 Diospyros aifatensis  
 Diospyros alatella  
 Diospyros albiflora  
 Diospyros alboflavescens  
 Diospyros alisu  
 Diospyros alpina  
 Diospyros amabi  
 Diospyros amanap  
 Diospyros amaniensis  
 Diospyros amboinensis  
 Diospyros analamerensis  
 Diospyros andamanica  
 Diospyros angulata  
 Diospyros anisandra  
 Diospyros anisocalyx  
 Diospyros anitae  
 Diospyros ankifiensis  
 Diospyros anosivolensis  
 Diospyros apeibocarpos  
 Diospyros apiculata  
 Diospyros araripensis  
 Diospyros areolata  
 Diospyros areolifolia  
 Diospyros argentea  
 Diospyros armata  
 Diospyros artanthifolia  
 Diospyros arupaj  
 Diospyros atrata  
 Diospyros atrotricha  
 Diospyros attenuata  
 Diospyros aurea  
 Diospyros australis  – yellow persimmon, black plum, grey plum

B

 Diospyros balansae  
 Diospyros balfouriana  
 Diospyros baloen-ldjoek  
 Diospyros bambuseti  
 Diospyros bangkana  
 Diospyros bangoiensis  
 Diospyros baranensis  
 Diospyros barberi  
 Diospyros baroniana  
 Diospyros barteri  
 Diospyros batocana  
 Diospyros beccarioides  
 Diospyros bejaudii  
 Diospyros bemarivensis  
 Diospyros benstonei  
 Diospyros bernieri  
 Diospyros bernieriana  
 Diospyros bezofensis  
 Diospyros bibracteata  
 Diospyros bipindensis  
 Diospyros blancoi  – kamagong, mabolo, butter fruit, velvet-apple 
 Diospyros blepharophylla  
 Diospyros blumutensis  
 Diospyros boala  
 Diospyros boiviniana  
 Diospyros boivinii  
 Diospyros boliviana  
 Diospyros bonii  
 Diospyros borbonica  
 Diospyros borneensis  
 Diospyros bourdillonii  
 Diospyros boutoniana  
 Diospyros brainii  
 Diospyros brandisiana  
 Diospyros brasiliensis  
 Diospyros brassica  
 Diospyros brevicalyx  
 Diospyros brideliifolia  
 Diospyros britannoborneensis  
 Diospyros bullata  
 Diospyros bumelioides  
 Diospyros bundeyana  
 Diospyros burchellii  
 Diospyros burmanica  
 Diospyros bussei  
 Diospyros buxifolia

C

 Diospyros cacharensis  
 Diospyros cachimboensis  
 Diospyros calcicola  
 Diospyros calciphila  
 Diospyros californica  
 Diospyros caloneura  
 Diospyros calophylla  
 Diospyros calycantha  
 Diospyros cambodiana  
 Diospyros campanulata  
 Diospyros campechiana  
 Diospyros camposii  
 Diospyros canaliculata  
 Diospyros candolleana  
 Diospyros capreifolia  
 Diospyros capricornuta  
 Diospyros carbonaria  
 Diospyros caribaea  — tagua-tagua, native to Cuban moist forests.
 Diospyros carpinifolia  
 Diospyros castanea  
 Diospyros cathayensis  
 Diospyros caudisepala  
 Diospyros cauliflora  
 Diospyros cauligera  
 Diospyros cavalcantei  
 Diospyros cayennensis  
 Diospyros celebica  – Makassar ebony
 Diospyros chaetocarpa  
 Diospyros chamaethamnus  – sand apple
 Diospyros changii  
 Diospyros chartacea  
 Diospyros cherrieri  
 Diospyros chevalieri  
 Diospyros chloroxylon  
 Diospyros choboensis  
 Diospyros christophersenii  
 Diospyros chrysocarpa  
 Diospyros chrysophyllos  
 Diospyros chunii  
 Diospyros cinnabarina  
 Diospyros cinnamomoides  
 Diospyros clementium  
 Diospyros clusiifolia  
 Diospyros coaetanca  
 Diospyros coccinea  
 Diospyros coccolobifolia  
 Diospyros collinsiae  
 Diospyros comorensis  
 Diospyros confertiflora  
 Diospyros conformis  
 Diospyros conifera  
 Diospyros conocarpa  
 Diospyros consanguinea  
 Diospyros consolatae  
 Diospyros conzattii  
 Diospyros cooperi  
 Diospyros corallina  
 Diospyros cordata  
 Diospyros cordato-oblonga  
 Diospyros coriacea  
 Diospyros coursiana  
 Diospyros crassiflora  — Gaboon ebony, Gabon ebony, African ebony, West African ebony, Benin ebony
 Diospyros crassinervis  
 subsp. urbaniana  
 Diospyros crebripilis  
 Diospyros crockerensis  
 Diospyros crotalaria  
 Diospyros crumenata  
 Diospyros cupulifera  
 Diospyros cupulosa  
 Diospyros curranii

D

 Diospyros daemona  
 Diospyros dalyom  
 Diospyros danguyana  
 Diospyros dasyphylla  
 Diospyros decandra  – gold apple
 Diospyros decaryana  
 Diospyros defectrix  
 Diospyros dendo  
 Diospyros densiflora  
 Diospyros dichroa  
 Diospyros dichrophylla  
 Diospyros dicorypheoides  
 Diospyros dictyoneura  
 Diospyros diepenhorstii  
 Diospyros digyna  — black sapote, native to Hispaniolan moist forests ecoregion.
 Diospyros dinhensis  
 Diospyros discocalyx  
 Diospyros discolor  
 Diospyros diversifolia  
 Diospyros diversilimba  
 Diospyros dodecandra  
 Diospyros dolmen  
 Diospyros domarkind  
 Diospyros domingensis  — endemic to montane Hispaniola island.
 Diospyros duartei  
 Diospyros dumetorum  
 Diospyros dussaudii

E
 Diospyros ebenifera  
 Diospyros ebenoides  
 Diospyros ebenum  – Ceylon ebony, India ebony, "ebony"
 Diospyros eburnea  
 Diospyros egleri  
 Diospyros egrettarum  
 Diospyros ehretioides  
 Diospyros ekodul  
 Diospyros elegans  
 Diospyros elephasii  
 Diospyros elliotii  
 Diospyros ellipsoidea  
 Diospyros elliptica — native to Lakeba, Fiji.
 Diospyros elliptifolia  
 Diospyros eriantha  
 Diospyros erudita  
 Diospyros erythrosperma  
 Diospyros esmereg  
 Diospyros eucalyptifolia  
 Diospyros euphlehia  
 Diospyros evena  
 Diospyros everettii  
 Diospyros exsculpta

F

 Diospyros fanjingshanica  
 Diospyros fasciculosa  — native to Australia
 Diospyros fastidiosa  
 Diospyros feliciana  
 Diospyros fenal  
 Diospyros fengchangensis  
 Diospyros fengii  
 Diospyros ferox  
 Diospyros ferrea  
 Diospyros ferruginescens  
 Diospyros filipendula  
 Diospyros filipes  
 Diospyros fischeri  
 Diospyros flavocarpa  
 Diospyros fleuryana  
 Diospyros foliolosa  
 Diospyros foliosa  
 Diospyros forbesii  
 Diospyros forrestii  
 Diospyros foxworthyi  
 Diospyros fragrans  
 Diospyros froesii  
 Diospyros frutescens  
 Diospyros fulvopilosa  
 Diospyros fuscovelutina  
 Diospyros fusicarpa  
 Diospyros fusiformis

G
 Diospyros gabunensis  
 Diospyros gallo  
 Diospyros galpinii  
 Diospyros gambleana  
 Diospyros gaultheriifolia  
 Diospyros geminata  
 Diospyros ghatensis  
 Diospyros gigantocarpa  
 Diospyros gillespiei  
 var. nandarivatensis  
 Diospyros gilletii  
 Diospyros gillisonii  
 Diospyros glabra  
 Diospyros glabrata  
 Diospyros glandulifera  
 Diospyros glandulosa  
 Diospyros glans  
 Diospyros glaucifolia  
 Diospyros glaucophylla  
 Diospyros glomerata  
 Diospyros goudotii  
 Diospyros gracilescens  
 Diospyros gracilipes  — native to Madagascar
 Diospyros gracilis  
 Diospyros greenwayi  
 Diospyros greshoffiana  
 Diospyros greveana  
 subsp. boinensis  
 Diospyros grex  
 Diospyros grisebachii  — ébano, native to Cuban cactus scrub ecoregion.
 Diospyros guatterioides  
 Diospyros guianensis  
 subsp. akaraiensis

H

 Diospyros haberi  
 Diospyros hackenbergii  
 Diospyros hainanensis  
 Diospyros haivanensis  
 Diospyros halesioides  
 Diospyros hallieri  
 Diospyros haplostylis  
 Diospyros hartmanniana  
 Diospyros hasseltii  
 Diospyros hassleri  
 Diospyros havilandii  
 Diospyros hayatae  
 Diospyros hazomainty  
 Diospyros hebecarpa  
 Diospyros hemiteles  
 Diospyros heterosepala  
 Diospyros heterotricha  
 Diospyros heudelotii  
 Diospyros hexamera  
 Diospyros hierniana  
 Diospyros hilairei  
 Diospyros hillebrandii  
 Diospyros hirsuta  
 Diospyros hispida  
 Diospyros holeana  
 Diospyros holttumii  
 Diospyros howii  
 Diospyros hoyleana  
 Diospyros humbertiana  
 Diospyros humilis  – Queensland ebony

I
 Diospyros implexicalyx  
 Diospyros impolita  
 Diospyros impressa  
 Diospyros inconstans  
 Diospyros inexplorata  
 Diospyros inflata  
 Diospyros inhacaensis  
 Diospyros insidiosa  
 Diospyros insignis  
 Diospyros insularis  – Papua ebony 
 Diospyros intricata  
 Diospyros ismailii  
 Diospyros iturensis

J
 Diospyros janeirensis  
 Diospyros janowskyi  
 Diospyros japonica  
 Diospyros javanica  
 Diospyros johnstoniana  
 Diospyros johorensis  
 Diospyros juruensis

K

 Diospyros kabuyeana  
 Diospyros kajangensis  
 Diospyros kaki  – Japanese persimmon, Kaki persimmon, Asian persimmon
 Diospyros kamerunensis  
 Diospyros kanizur  
 Diospyros kanurii  
 Diospyros katendei  
 Diospyros keningauensis  
 Diospyros kerrii  
 Diospyros ketsensis  
 Diospyros ketun  
 Diospyros kika  
 Diospyros kingii  
 Diospyros kintungensis  
 Diospyros kirkii  
 Diospyros kochummenii  
 Diospyros koeboeensis  
 Diospyros koenigii  
 Diospyros kolom  
 Diospyros kondor  
 Diospyros korthalsiana  
 Diospyros korupensis  
 Diospyros kostermansii  
 Diospyros kotoensis  
 Diospyros krukovii  
 Diospyros kupensis  
 Diospyros kurzii  – Andaman marblewood

L

 Diospyros labillardierei  
 Diospyros laevis  
 Diospyros lanceifolia  
 Diospyros lanceolata  
 Diospyros landii  
 Diospyros lanticellata  
 Diospyros lateralis  
 Diospyros latisepala  
 Diospyros latispathulata  
 Diospyros leonardii  
 Diospyros leonis  
 Diospyros leucomelas  
 Diospyros liberiensis  
 Diospyros lissocarpoides  
 Diospyros lobata  
 Diospyros lolin  
 Diospyros lolinopsis  
 Diospyros longibracteata  
 Diospyros longiciliata  
 Diospyros longiflora  
 Diospyros longipedicellata  
 Diospyros longipilosa  
 Diospyros longistyla  
 Diospyros longshengensis  
 Diospyros lotus  – date-plum, Caucasian persimmon, lilac persimmon
 Diospyros loureiroana  
 subsp. rufescens  
 Diospyros louvelii  
 Diospyros lunduensis  
 Diospyros lycioides  – Bushveld Bluebush
 subsp. guerkei  
 subsp. nitens  
 subsp. sericea

M

 Diospyros mabacea  – Red-fruited ebony
 Diospyros maclurei  
 Diospyros macrocarpa  
 Diospyros macrophylla  
 Diospyros madecassa  
 Diospyros mafiensis  
 Diospyros magogoana  
 Diospyros maingayi  
 Diospyros major  
 Diospyros malabarica  – black-and-white ebony, pale moon ebony, malabar ebony, gaub tree
 Diospyros malaccensis  
 Diospyros malacothrix  
 Diospyros manampetsae  
 Diospyros manausensis  
 Diospyros mangabensis  
 Diospyros mangorensis  
 Diospyros mannii  
 Diospyros manu  
 Diospyros mapingo  
 Diospyros margaretae  
 Diospyros maritima  
 Diospyros marmorata  – marblewood ebony, "marblewood"
 Diospyros martabanica  
 Diospyros martini  
 Diospyros masoalensis  
 Diospyros matheriana  
 Diospyros mattogrossensis  
 Diospyros megasepala  
 Diospyros melanida  
 Diospyros melanoxylon  – Coromandel ebony, East Indian ebony
 var. tupru  
 Diospyros melocarpa  
 Diospyros mespiliformis  – jackalberry, african ebony
 Diospyros metcalfii  
 Diospyros mexiae  
 Diospyros miaoshanica  
 Diospyros micrantha  
 Diospyros micromera  
 Diospyros microrhombus  
 Diospyros miltonii  
 Diospyros minahassae  
 Diospyros mindanaensis  
 Diospyros minimifolia  
 Diospyros minutiflora  
 Diospyros minutiloba  
 Diospyros moi  
 Diospyros mollis  
 Diospyros mollissima  
 Diospyros monbuttensis  
 Diospyros montana  
 Diospyros moonii  
 Diospyros morrisiana  
 Diospyros multibracteata  
 Diospyros multiflora  
 Diospyros multinervis  
 Diospyros mun  – mun ebony
 Diospyros muricata  
 Diospyros mweroensis  
 Diospyros myrmecocarpa  
 Diospyros myrtifolia

N
 Diospyros nana  
 Diospyros nanay  
 Diospyros natalensis  
 Diospyros natalensis subsp. nummularia  
 Diospyros navillei  
 Diospyros nebulosa  
 Diospyros neglecta  
 Diospyros neilgerrensis  
 Diospyros nemorosa  
 Diospyros nenab  
 Diospyros neraudii  
 Diospyros neurosepala  
 Diospyros nhatrangensis  
 Diospyros nigra  — black sapote, chocolate pudding fruit, black persimmon
 Diospyros nigricans  
 Diospyros nigrocortex  
 Diospyros nilagirica  
 Diospyros nitida  
 Diospyros nodosa  
 Diospyros normanbyensis  
 Diospyros novoguineensis  
 Diospyros nummulariifolia  
 Diospyros nur  
 Diospyros nutans

O
 Diospyros oaxacana  
 Diospyros obliquifolia  
 Diospyros oblonga  
 Diospyros oblongifolia  
 Diospyros occlusa  
 Diospyros occulta  
 Diospyros okkesii  
 Diospyros oldhamii  
 Diospyros oleifera  
 Diospyros olen  
 Diospyros oligantha  
 Diospyros oliviformis  
 Diospyros onanae  
 Diospyros oocarpa  
 Diospyros opaca  
 Diospyros oppositifolia  
 Diospyros orthioneura  
 Diospyros ottohuberi  
 Diospyros oubatchensis  
 Diospyros ovalifolia  
 Diospyros ovalis  
 Diospyros oxycarpa

P

 Diospyros pahangensis  
 Diospyros palauensis  
 Diospyros palembanica  
 Diospyros pallens  
 Diospyros palmeri  
 Diospyros panamensis  
 Diospyros pancheri  
 Diospyros panguana  
 Diospyros paniculata  
 Diospyros papuana  
 Diospyros parabuxifolia  
 Diospyros paraensis  
 Diospyros parifolia  
 Diospyros parviflora  
 Diospyros parvifolia  
 Diospyros pauciflora  
 Diospyros peekelii  
 Diospyros pemadasae  
 Diospyros penangiana  
 Diospyros pendula  
 Diospyros penibukanensis  
 Diospyros pentamera  – myrtle ebony, grey persimmon, black myrtle, grey plum
 Diospyros perakensis  
 Diospyros perfida  
 Diospyros perglauca  
 Diospyros perplexa  
 Diospyros perreticulata  
 Diospyros perrieri  
 Diospyros pervillei  
 Diospyros phanrangensis  
 Diospyros philippinensis  
 Diospyros phlebodes  
 Diospyros phuketensis  
 Diospyros physocalycina  
 Diospyros pierrei  
 Diospyros pilosanthera  
 Diospyros pilosiuscula  
 Diospyros piresii  
 Diospyros piscatoria  
 Diospyros piscicapa  
 Diospyros platanoides  
 Diospyros platycalyx  
 Diospyros plectosepala  
 Diospyros poeppigiana  
 Diospyros polita  
 Diospyros polystemon  
 Diospyros poncei  
 Diospyros potamica  
 Diospyros potingensis  
 Diospyros preussii  
 Diospyros pruinosa  
 var. geayana  
 Diospyros pruriens  
 Diospyros pseudoharmandii  
 Diospyros pseudomalabarica  
 Diospyros pseudomespilus  
 subsp. undabunda  
 Diospyros pseudoxylopia  
 Diospyros pterocalyx  
 Diospyros pubescens  
 Diospyros pulchra  
 Diospyros puncticulosa  
 Diospyros punctilimba  
 Diospyros pustulata  
 Diospyros pyrrhocarpa

Q
 Diospyros quaesita  
 Diospyros quiloensis

R
 Diospyros rabiensis  
 Diospyros racemosa  
 Diospyros ramiflora  
 Diospyros ramulosa  
 Diospyros ranongensis  
 Diospyros rekoi  
 Diospyros relit  
 Diospyros reticulinervis  
 Diospyros revaughanii  
 Diospyros revoluta    (syn.  Diospyros ebenaster Retz.) 
 Diospyros revolutissima  
 Diospyros rheophytica  
 Diospyros rhodocalyx  
 Diospyros rhododendroides  
 Diospyros rhombifolia  
 Diospyros ridleyi  
 Diospyros ridsdalei  
 Diospyros riedelii  
 Diospyros rigida  
 Diospyros ropourea  
 Diospyros rosei  
 Diospyros rostrata  
 Diospyros rotok  
 Diospyros rotundifolia  
 Diospyros rubicunda  
 Diospyros rufa  
 Diospyros rufogemmata  
 Diospyros rumphii

S

 Diospyros sahayadryensis  
 Diospyros sakalavarum  
 Diospyros saldanhae  
 Diospyros salicifolia  
 Diospyros salletii  
 Diospyros samoensis  — native to Samoan Archipelago & other islands of Micronesica/Polynesia.
 Diospyros sandwicensis  
 Diospyros sankurensis  
 Diospyros santaremnensis  
 Diospyros sanza-minika  
 Diospyros savannarum  
 Diospyros saxatilis  
 Diospyros saxicola  
 Diospyros scabiosa  
 Diospyros scabra  
 Diospyros scabrida  
 Diospyros scalariformis  
 Diospyros schmutzii  
 Diospyros sclerophylla  
 Diospyros scortechinii  
 Diospyros scottmorii  
 Diospyros selangorensis  
 Diospyros senensis  
 Diospyros sericea  
 Diospyros serrana  
 Diospyros seychellarum  
 Diospyros shimbaensis  
 Diospyros siamang  
 Diospyros sichourensis  
 Diospyros siderophylla  
 Diospyros simaloerensis  
 Diospyros simii  
 Diospyros sinaloensis  
 Diospyros singaporensis  
 Diospyros sintenisii  — endemic to Puerto Rico
 Diospyros sleumeri  
 Diospyros sogeriensis  
 Diospyros sonorae  
 Diospyros soporifera  
 Diospyros sororia  
 Diospyros soubreana  
 Diospyros soyauxii  
 Diospyros sparsirama  
 Diospyros sphaerosepala  
 Diospyros sprucei  
 Diospyros squamifolia  
 Diospyros squamosa  
 Diospyros squarrosa  
 Diospyros streptosepala  
 Diospyros stricta  
 Diospyros strigosa  
 Diospyros striicalyx  
 Diospyros styraciformis  
 Diospyros suaveolens  
 Diospyros subacuta  
 Diospyros subenervis  
 Diospyros subfalciformis  
 Diospyros subrhomboidea  
 Diospyros subrotata  
 Diospyros subsessilifolia  
 Diospyros subsessilis  
 Diospyros subtrinervis  
 Diospyros subtruncata  
 Diospyros sulcata  
 Diospyros sumatrana  
 Diospyros sundaica  
 Diospyros sunyiensis  
 Diospyros susarticulata  
 Diospyros sutchuensis  
 Diospyros sylvatica

T

 Diospyros tampinensis  
 Diospyros tarim  
 Diospyros tenuiflora  
 Diospyros tenuipes  
 Diospyros tepu  
 Diospyros terminalis  
 Diospyros tero  
 Diospyros tessellaria  – Mauritius ebony
 Diospyros tessmannii  
 Diospyros tetraceros  
 Diospyros tetrandra  
 Diospyros tetrapoda  
 Diospyros tetrasperma  
 Diospyros texana  – Texas persimmon, Mexican persimmon, black persimmon
 Diospyros thaiensis  
 Diospyros thomasii  
 Diospyros thorelii  
 Diospyros thouarsii  
 Diospyros thwaitesii  
 Diospyros tireliae  
 Diospyros tonkinensis  
 Diospyros torquata  
 Diospyros touranensis  
 Diospyros toxicaria  
 Diospyros transita  
 Diospyros transitoria  
 Diospyros trengganuensis  
 Diospyros trianthos  
 Diospyros trichophylla  
 Diospyros tricolor  
 Diospyros tridentata  
 Diospyros tristis  
 Diospyros trisulca  
 Diospyros trombetensis  
 Diospyros troupinii  
 Diospyros truncata  
 Diospyros truncatifolia  
 Diospyros tsangii  
 Diospyros tuberculata  
 Diospyros turfosa  
 Diospyros tutcheri  
 Diospyros uaupensis

U
 Diospyros ubaita  
 Diospyros ulo  
 Diospyros umbrosa  
 Diospyros undulata  
 Diospyros unisemina  
 Diospyros urep  
 Diospyros urschii  
 Diospyros uzungwaensis

V

 Diospyros vaccinioides  
 Diospyros variegata  
 Diospyros veillonii  
 Diospyros velutinosa  
 Diospyros velutipes  
 Diospyros venenosa  
 Diospyros venosa  
 var. olivacea  
 Diospyros vera  
 Diospyros vermoesenii  
 Diospyros verrucosa  
 Diospyros vescoi  
 Diospyros vestita  
 Diospyros vieillardii  
 Diospyros vignei  
 Diospyros villosa  
 Diospyros villosiuscula  
 Diospyros virgata  
 Diospyros virginiana  – American persimmon, Eastern persimmon, Common persimmon, possumwood, simmon, sugar-plum
 Diospyros viridicans  
 Diospyros vitiensis  
 var. longisepala

W

 Diospyros wagemansii  
 Diospyros wajirensis  
 Diospyros walkeri  
 Diospyros wallichii  
 Diospyros weddellii  
 Diospyros whitei  
 Diospyros whitfordii  
 Diospyros whyteana  – Cape ebony
 Diospyros winitii

X
 Diospyros xavantina  
 Diospyros xiangguiensis  
 Diospyros xishuangbannaensis

Y
 Diospyros yaouhensis  
 Diospyros yatesiana  
 Diospyros yeobi  
 Diospyros yomomo  
 Diospyros yucatanensis  
 subsp. spectabilis  
 Diospyros yunnanensis

Z
 Diospyros zenkeri  
 Diospyros zhenfengensis  
 Diospyros zombensis

References

External links
 
 

+
Diospyros
Diospyros